Sal F. Albanese (born August 29, 1949) is a politician from New York City. He served as a New York City Council member, and ran unsuccessfully for several other public offices including New York State Assembly, United States Congress, and Mayor of New York City.

Personal and professional life
Albanese was born in Mammola, Calabria, Italy. He came to New York City when he was eight years old and attended Our Lady of Peace Grammar School and John Jay High School. He received his Bachelor of Arts in Education from York College, City University of New York in 1972. After graduating from York, he taught in the New York Public School system at his alma mater, John Jay High School, for eleven years. Concurrently, he earned a Master of Arts in Health from New York University in 1976.

Albanese was elected to the New York City Council in 1982. During his tenure, he earned a J.D. from Brooklyn Law School in 1990 and became a member of the New York State Bar. After leaving public office in 1998, he became Marketing Director for INVESCO and then Managing Director of Institutional Sales & Marketing for Mesirow Financial. He currently holds Series 7 and 63 Financial services licenses.

Albanese and his wife Lorraine lived in Bay Ridge, Brooklyn, before moving to Staten Island in 2017. The couple has two adult daughters, Danielle and Laura.

Following a failed bid for Mayor in 2013, Albanese returned to practicing law as Of Counsel at Allegaert Berger & Vogel LLP.

Political career
In 1978, Albanese ran for New York State Assembly in the 50th district, losing 44.25% to 55.75% to Republican Florence Sullivan. Four years later, he ran for City Council and defeated Angelo J. Arculeo 51.44% to 48.57%. Arculeo was a 21-year incumbent and Republican-Conservative Minority Leader. Albanese won reelection four times and represented the 43rd district in the City Council until 1997, when he became a candidate for Mayor of New York City. He received 21% in the Democratic primary in 1997, coming in third place.

In 1992, Albanese ran for United States Congress in the New York's 13th congressional district. He was defeated by Susan Molinari, who won 56.13% of the vote to Albanese's 38.24%. He returned to his work in the City Council thereafter.

As a Council Member, Albanese was a member of the Council’s Public Safety, Education, and Transportation committees. He drafted laws requiring mandatory drug testing for school bus drivers and overhauled the previously-failing High School of Telecommunications.

He supported increasing police presence in under-patrolled neighborhoods through community policing. He also initiated legislation requiring police to publish response times to emergency calls and led a successful effort to update the City's antiquated 9-1-1 system.
Despite objections from Mayor Rudy Giuliani, Albanese passed the New York City Living Wage Bill in 1996, which "required some city contractors to pay higher minimum wages to their employees." He was also the original sponsor of a Campaign Finance Reform Bill, stating that "If the present system stays in place, you will continue to have a city run for a few wealthy interests and by big business." He famously voted against the proposed 1995 and 1996 budgets, arguing that they "balanced [the budget] on the backs of the middle class, poor, elderly and the youth of this city."

In the 1997 New York City mayoral election, Albanese ran for Mayor of New York City, placing third in the Democratic Party primary election. He earned 21.02% of the vote compared to Al Sharpton's 32.05% and winner Ruth Messinger's 40.19%. In 2000, he briefly entered the Mayoral race for a second time before bowing out early, citing the high cost of fundraising.

In 2008, he was part of then-Senator Barack Obama's New York delegation to the Democratic National Convention.

On December 14, 2012, Albanese opened a campaign for mayor in the 2013 New York City mayoral election. He placed eighth out of nine candidates in the Democratic Party primary, receiving 0.9% of the vote.

Albanese again ran for mayor in the 2017 New York City mayoral election. He finished second in the Democratic primary with approximately 15% of the vote, but secured the Reform Party's nomination and appeared on the general election ballot where he placed third behind incumbent Bill de Blasio and eventual Republican Congresswoman Nicole Malliotakis.

 

Albanese became the Democratic candidate for a City Council seat representing Staten Island in 2021, but conceded defeat to Republican David M. Carr.

References

External links
Official 2021 Campaign Site
Official 2017 Campaign Site
Official 2013 Campaign Site

1949 births
20th-century American politicians
21st-century American politicians
American people of Arbëreshë descent
American people of Italian descent
Brooklyn Law School alumni
Italian emigrants to the United States
Living people
New York (state) Democrats
New York City Council members
People from Bay Ridge, Brooklyn
Reform Party of the United States of America politicians
Steinhardt School of Culture, Education, and Human Development alumni
York College, City University of New York alumni